Gun Harbor Brook is a river in Herkimer County, New York that flows into Stillwater Reservoir at Gun Harbor north of Beaver River, New York.

References

Rivers of New York (state)
Rivers of Herkimer County, New York